Clivina basalis is a species of ground beetle in the subfamily Scaritinae. It was described by Chaudoir in 1843.

References

basalis
Beetles described in 1843
Beetles of New Zealand